Events during the year 1967 in Northern Ireland.

Incumbents
 Governor - 	The Lord Erskine of Rerrick
 Prime Minister - Terence O'Neill

Events
29 January - Northern Ireland Civil Rights Association founded in Belfast.
6 September - Myrina is launched from the Musgrave Yard slipway at Harland and Wolff in Belfast, the first supertanker and (at around 192000 DWT) largest ship built in the United Kingdom up to this date.
December - Taoiseach Jack Lynch and Prime Minister of Northern Ireland Terence O'Neill meet for talks at Stormont.

Arts and literature
The first treasure from the Spanish Armada wreck Girona is recovered.
The Ulster Architectural Heritage Society is founded under the chairmanship of Charles Brett.

Sport

Football
Irish League
Winners: Glentoran

Irish Cup
Winners: Crusaders 3 - 1 Glentoran

Births
9 January - Uel Graham, former cricketer.
11 February- Paul McLoone, frontman with The Undertones, voice actor and radio presenter with Today FM.
17 February - Gary Fleming, footballer.
4 April - David Perry, video game developer.
26 April - Robbie Millar, chef and restaurateur (died 2005).
24 May - Deirdre Gribbin, composer.
2 June - Alan Rutherford, cricketer.
12 July - Sean Connor, footballer and manager.
1 October - Geraldine Heaney, defenceman (ice hockey) and head coach.
22 October - Dawn Purvis, leader of the Progressive Unionist Party and MLA.
24 October - Terence Bannon, mountaineer.
November - Mairtín Crawford, poet and journalist (died 2004).
27 November - Andrea Catherwood, television news presenter.
14 December - George O'Boyle, footballer.
Full date unknown - Paul Kearney, author.

Deaths
28 February - Dick Keith, footballer (born 1933).
12 April - Sam English, footballer (born 1908).

See also
1967 in Scotland
1967 in Wales

References

 
Northern Ireland